Aphanotus is a genus of darkling beetles in the family Tenebrionidae. Species in this genus were previously within Tribolium but placed in the genus Aphanotus following phylogenetic evidence.

Species
 Aphanotus brevicornis  (Leconte, 1859)
 Aphanotus carinatum (Hinton, 1948)
 Aphanotus gebieni (Uyttenboogaart, 1934)
 Aphanotus parallelus (Casey, 1890)
 Aphanotus linsleyi (Hinton, 1948)
 Aphanotus setosum (Triplehorn, 1978)
 Aphanotus uezumii (Nakane, 1963)

References

Tenebrionidae genera